John Danner may refer to:
 John Danner (inventor)
 John Danner (entrepreneur)